The Tepiti (Debidigh) or Teppathiggi were an indigenous Australian tribe of Queensland. They may be the same as the Lotiga (Luthigh).

Country

Alternative names
 Tepithiki.
 Teyepathiggi, Teppathiggi.
 ? Teepani.

Notes

Citations

Sources

Aboriginal peoples of Queensland